Kimiatu Tiriamai (born 5 December 1964) is a former New Zealand rugby union player. She played at Lock for the Black Ferns and Auckland. She also played club rugby for Ponsonby. She debuted for the Black Ferns against the California Grizzlies at Christchurch on 22 July 1989.

Tiriamai was a member of the 1991 Women's Rugby World Cup squad. She featured in their pool games against Canada and Wales.

References 

1964 births
Living people
New Zealand women's international rugby union players
New Zealand female rugby union players